Seamus Henry (born July 4, 1949) is a Northern Ireland-born former member of the Legislative Assembly of the Northwest Territories.

He was elected to the Northwest Territories Legislature in the 1995 Northwest Territories general election. He defeated incumbent Tony Whitford in an upset race by four votes. Henry retired from politics at the end of his term in 1999.

References

External links
NWT Votes 2003 Yellowknife South Profile

Living people
Northern Ireland emigrants to Canada
Members of the Legislative Assembly of the Northwest Territories
People from Yellowknife
1949 births